Enshakushanna, or Enshagsagana, En-shag-kush-ana, Enukduanna, En-Shakansha-Ana, En-šakušuana was a king of Uruk around the mid-3rd millennium BC who is named on the Sumerian King List, which states his reign to have been 60 years. He conquered Hamazi, Akkad, Kish, and Nippur, claiming hegemony over all of Sumer.

Titulature
He adopted the Sumerian title en ki-en-gi lugal kalam ., which may be translated as "lord of Sumer and king of all the land" (which possibly implies "en of the region of Uruk and lugal of the region of Ur"), and could correspond to the later title lugal ki-en-gi ki-uri "King of Sumer and Akkad" that eventually came to signify kingship over Mesopotamia as a whole.

Reign 
Enshakushanna's reign is largely characterized by his military campaigns, the most prominent of which was against Kish and Akshak. His attack on these two cities is attested from a stone bowl at Nippur and reads as follows:For Enlil, king of all lands,

Enshakushanna, lord of the land of Sumer and king of the nation 

when the gods commanded him,

he sacked Kish  

(and) captured Enbi-Ishtar, the king of Kish. 

The leader of Kish and the leader of Akshak, (when) both their cities were destroyed ... 

(Lacuna)  

in (?) [..] he returned to them,  

but [he] dedicated their statues, their precious metals and lapis lazuli, their timber and treasure, to the god Enlil at [N]ippur.Many scholars have attributed the EDIIIb destruction layers at the Palace A and Plano-Convex Building in Kish to Enshakushanna. Federico Zaina notes the archaeological evidence at Kish attests to a "pervasive violent destruction of the city of Kish at the end of the ED IIIb". Apart from his attacks to the North, Enshakushanna is also known to have attacked Akkad. A year name of En-šakušuana, king of Uruk was "Year in which En-šakušuana defeated Akkad". This would have been shortly before the rise of the Akkadian Empire.

Succession
He was succeeded in Uruk by Lugal-kinishe-dudu, but the hegemony seems to have passed to Eannatum of Lagash for a time. Lugal-kinishe-dudu was later allied with Entemena, a successor of Eannatum, against Lagash's principal rival, Umma.

Inscriptions
Several inscriptions of Enshakushanna are known. A dedication tablet in his name is known, now in the State Hermitage Museum, St. Petersburg, Russian Federation:

The inscription states his father was "Elilina", possibly King Elulu of Ur.

References

Sumerian kings
24th-century BC Sumerian kings
Kings of Uruk